The 2006 Football Federation South Australia season was the 100th season of soccer in South Australia, and the first under the FFSA format.

2006 FFSA Super League

The 2006 South Australian Super League was the first season of the South Australian Super League, the new top division of association football in South Australia, replacing the South Australian Premier League, which became the second division. It was also the first year that football in South Australia was run by the Football Federation of South Australia, which replaced the South Australian Soccer Federation. The season came down to a final round relegation battle between White City Woodville and Adelaide Olympic. Olympic lost 3–1 at Modbury while White City went down 1–0 away to Cumberland. This sent Olympic down to play in the Premier League in 2007. Adelaide City won the title with games to spare after being runaway leaders, finishing the season unbeaten.

2006 FFSA Premier League

The 2006 FFSA Premier League was the first edition of the FFSA Premier League as the second level domestic association football competition in South Australia. 10 teams competed, all playing each other twice for a total of 18 rounds, with the League winners promoted to the 2007 FFSA Super League, and the bottom two placed teams were relegated to the 2007 FFSA State League.

2006 FFSA State League

The 2006 FFSA State League was the first edition of the FFSA State League as the third level domestic association football competition in South Australia. 8 teams competed, all playing each other three times for a total of 21 rounds. The League winners and second placers were promoted to the 2007 FFSA Premier League.

See also
2006 FFSA Premier League
2006 FFSA Super League
2006 FFSA State League
National Premier Leagues South Australia
Football Federation South Australia

References

2011 in Australian soccer
Football South Australia seasons